Siegfried Samson Goldschmidt (29 October 1844 – 31 January 1884) was a German Indologist. His interest was centered upon Prakrit grammar and vocabulary, and his articles formed valuable contributions to the investigation of middle Indo-Aryan languages.

Biography
Siegfried Goldschmidt was born in Cassel, Germany, the youngest child of Jewish court banker Philipp Samson Goldschmidt and his wife Minna. After Philipp's death in 1846, Goldschmidt's mother married , with whom she had one child, lawyer  (father of Hans Rothfels).

Goldschmidt was educated at the gymnasium in Cassel, before studying philosophy and (mostly Sanskrit) philology the Universities of Leipzig, Berlin, and Tübingen, graduating with a Ph.D. on 20 August 1867. His doctor's dissertation, "Der VII Prapâṭhaka des Sâmaveda-Ârcika in der Naigeya-Çakhâ Nebst Andern Mitteilungen über Dieselbe", published in the Monatsberichte der Königlichen Preussischen Akademie der Wissenschaften (1868, pp. 228–248), was an edition of the single portion which has been preserved of the Kâuthuma recension of the Samaveda. Goldschmidt continued his studies, first at Göttingen and later in Paris, where he gained a thorough mastery of the French language.

On the outbreak of the Franco-Prussian War he returned to Germany and volunteered for military service. He took part in the Siege of Paris. At the close of the war Goldschmidt was appointed assistant professor in the newly Germanified University of Strasburg, with which he was connected during the remainder of his short life. He became professor on 12 September 1881, but soon had to discontinue his teaching activities as a result of spinal tuberculosis, which he contracted the previous summer. The illness progressed slowly until his death on 31 January 1884 at the age of 39.

Work
Siegfried Goldschmidt published only fourteen academic studies, mostly short notes in Kuhn's Zeitschrift für Vergleichende Sprachforschung and the Zeitschrift der Deutschen Morgenländischen Gesellschaft. His most important work was his edition of the great Prakrit poem ascribed to Kâlidâsa, the Sêtubandhu ('Building of the Bridge') or Râvaṇavaha ('Death of Ravana'), which describes the construction of a bridge of boats across the Vitasta by a king of Kashmir. This is in two volumes, the first of which comprises the text and an index of the Prakrit words, in preparing which Siegfried was assisted by his brother Paul, while the second part contains the German translation. The only other book published by this scholar was a volume of Prâkṛtica, containing grammatical studies on Prakrit.

Selected publications

References

External links

1844 births
1884 deaths
19th-century German Jews
German Indologists
German military personnel of the Franco-Prussian War
Humboldt University of Berlin alumni
Jewish linguists
Leipzig University alumni
Linguists of Indo-Aryan languages
People from Kassel
Tuberculosis deaths in Germany
Academic staff of the University of Strasbourg
University of Tübingen alumni
19th-century deaths from tuberculosis